Anders Andersen (26 October 1881 – 19 February 1961) was a Danish sport wrestler who competed in the 1908 Summer Olympics and in the 1912 Summer Olympics.

In 1908 he won the bronze medal in the Greco-Roman middleweight class.

Four years later he was eliminated in the second round of the Greco-Roman middleweight competition.

References

External links
 

1881 births
1961 deaths
Olympic wrestlers of Denmark
Wrestlers at the 1908 Summer Olympics
Wrestlers at the 1912 Summer Olympics
Danish male sport wrestlers
Olympic bronze medalists for Denmark
Olympic medalists in wrestling
Medalists at the 1908 Summer Olympics
Sportspeople from Copenhagen
20th-century Danish people